A.G.J. (Ton) Strien  (born 23 March 1958 in Lopik) is a Dutch politician of the Christian Democratic Appeal (CDA). Since 1 September 2007 he has been Mayor of Olst-Wijhe, succeeding Bert Hinnen.  He has also been vice president and treasurer of the National Association CDA.

Previously he was a member of the provincial parliament of Utrecht, an alderman of Houten and also a member of the municipal council of this municipality.

Strien started his career as a civil servant.

References 

1958 births
Living people
Aldermen in Utrecht (province)
People from Houten
Christian Democratic Appeal politicians
Dutch civil servants
Mayors in Overijssel
Members of the Provincial Council of Utrecht
People from Lopik